Ruffles and flourishes are preceding fanfare for honors music, ceremonial music for distinguished people.

By country

Israel
In the Israeli Defense Forces, ruffles and flourishes are sounded as a guard of honor presents arms to signify the honors music that will follow. Depending on the status of the person receiving the honors, they will receive between one and three ruffles and flourishes in the honor of the recipient.

 President of Israel, foreign dignitaries: 3 ruffles and flourishes
 Prime minister of Israel, members of the Knesset: 2 ruffles and flourishes
 Cabinet members: 1 ruffle and flourish

Italy
Italy uses ruffles and flourishes, particularly at ceremonies where the raising of the Italian national flag takes place. The music that is sounded is known as "" ("Honors") and is played usually before the performance of an abridged version of "".

South Korea
South Korea uses ruffles and flourishes, with a total of four played before the South Korean national anthem, or the "Phoenix Hymn", which is the official honors music for the president of South Korea.

Philippines
The official ruffles and flourishes for the president of the Philippines is played four times before the playing of "" or "". During military events, the ruffles and flourishes are sounded alongside a 21-gun artillery salute.

United States

U.S. ruffles are played on drums, and flourishes are played on bugles. The president of the United States receives four ruffles and flourishes before "Hail to the Chief" and the vice president of the United States receives four ruffles and flourishes before "Hail, Columbia". In the U.S., four ruffles and flourishes is the maximum number played. Four ruffles and flourishes are played before national anthems, whether of the U.S. or foreign countries. General officers and admirals receive ruffles and floruishes equal to the number of stars they have, and then "General's March" or "Admiral's March" is played.

Although roughly equivalent, the United States Navy has a different "Table of Honors" – some civilian officials more, others less; often different musical tunes – and includes in its arsenal of formal Honors one more, which is specific to naval traditions: sideboys, an even number of seamen (in this list eight for guests with quadruple or triple ruffles and flourishes, six for lower ranking dignitaries) posted at the gangway when the dignitary boards or leaves the ship, historically to help (or even hoist) him aboard, currently as a ceremonial sort of guard of honor.

Vatican City
The newly-elected pope delivers after a thanksgiving address.

See also

21-gun salute
Military honors
Military band
Military drum

References

Articles containing video clips
Military life
Military music
Presidency of the United States
United States military traditions